Demonax is a genus of the family of the longhorn beetles (Cerambycidae), containing the following species groups and species:

Species groups
species group semiluctuosus
species group albicinctus
species group vethi
species group polyzonus
species group algebraicus
species group maximus
species group mulio
species group protogenes
species group lineatus
species group laticollis
species group notabilis
species group mustela
species group macilentus

Species

 Demonax acutipennis Dauber, 2006
 Demonax albomaculatus (Allard, 1894)
 Demonax albotrifasciatus Pic, 1925
 Demonax amandus Holzschuh, 1991
 Demonax andamanicus Gahan, 1906
 Demonax annulicornis (Chevrolat, 1863)
 Demonax apicalis Pascoe, 1869
 Demonax ascendens (Pascoe, 1859)
 Demonax bakeri Aurivillius, 1922
 Demonax bimaculicollis (Schwarzer, 1925)
 Demonax blairi Gardiner, 1940
 Demonax brevelineatus Pic, 1925
 Demonax brevespinosus Pic, 1926
 Demonax buteae Gardner, 1940
 Demonax celebensis Aurivillius, 1922
 Demonax christinae Holzschuh, 1983
 Demonax chrysoderes (White, 1855)
 Demonax cinereus Dauber, 2002
 Demonax confidens Holzschuh, 1993
 Demonax contaminatus Holzschuh, 2003
 Demonax contrarius Holzschuh, 1991
 Demonax culicinus Pascoe, 1869
 Demonax damalis Pascoe, 1869
 Demonax decens Gahan, 1906
 Demonax decorus Gahan, 1906
 Demonax delectus Gahan, 1907
 Demonax delesserti Chevrolat, 1863
 Demonax divisus Chevrolat, 1863
 Demonax dohertii Gahan, 1906
 Demonax dolosus Holzschuh, 1991
 Demonax donaubaueri Holzschuh, 1996
 Demonax dorotheae Holzschuh, 1983
 Demonax flavofasciatus Dauber, 2002
 Demonax formicoides (Lameere, 1890)
 Demonax formosomontanus Ikeda & Niisato, 1984
 Demonax fortis Holzschuh, 2003
 Demonax fryanus Gahan, 1906
 Demonax funebris (Lameere, 1890)
 Demonax fungongensis Guo & Chen, 2005
 Demonax furcathorax
 Demonax gertrudae Holzschuh, 1983
 Demonax granulicollis (Hayashi, 1974)
 Demonax gregalis Gahan, 1907
 Demonax grewicola Holzschuh, 2017
 Demonax gunjii Holzschuh, 1983
 Demonax himalayanus (Pic, 1912)
 Demonax humerovittatus Dauber, 2003
 Demonax imitatus Holzschuh, 1991
 Demonax incanus (Newman, 1842)
 Demonax ingridae Holzschuh, 1983
 Demonax iniquus Holzschuh, 1993
 Demonax inops Holzschuh, 1991
 Demonax inscutellaris Pic, 1937
 Demonax insuetus Holzschuh, 1991
 Demonax jamesi Holzschuh, 1986
 Demonax javanicus Fisher, 1936
 Demonax jeanvoinei Pic, 1927
 Demonax jendeki Holzschuh, 1995
 Demonax jezoensis Matsushita & Tamanuki, 1935
 Demonax jimmiensis Gressitt, 1959
 Demonax josefinae Holzschuh, 1983
 Demonax kalabi Holzschuh, 1998
 Demonax kanoi (Hayashi, 1963)
 Demonax katarinae Holzschuh, 1983
 Demonax kejvali Holzschuh, 2017
 Demonax kezukai Holzschuh, 1984
 Demonax kheoae Gressitt & Rondon, 1970
 Demonax kostali Holzschuh, 2003
 Demonax languidus Holzschuh, 1992
 Demonax leucophaeus Holzschuh, 1993
 Demonax leucoscutellatus (Hope, 1831)
 Demonax levipes Holzschuh, 1991
 Demonax lineola Chevrolat, 1863
 Demonax lineolatus Redtenbacher, 1868
 Demonax luteicollis Gressitt, 1959
 Demonax macilentoides Dauber, 2003
 Demonax maculicollis Gahan, 1906
 Demonax mariae Holzschuh, 1983
 Demonax marketae Viktora, 2014
 Demonax martes Pascoe, 1869
 Demonax masaoi Niisato, 1984
 Demonax masatakai Ohbayashi, 1964
 Demonax mendicus Holzschuh, 1991
 Demonax merinjakensis
 Demonax murudensis
 Demonax narayani Holzschuh, 1984
 Demonax nawatai Hayashi, 1975
 Demonax nishiyamai Niisato, 1984
 Demonax niveofasciatus Viktora, 2014
 Demonax notator (Pascoe, 1869)
 Demonax nothus Holzschuh, 1991
 Demonax octavus Aurivillius, 1922
 Demonax offensus Holzschuh, 1992
 Demonax olemehli Holzschuh, 1989
 Demonax ovicollis (Fairmaire, 1895)
 Demonax parallelus Aurivillius, 1922
 Demonax parilis Holzschuh, 1995
 Demonax pendleburyi Fisher, 1935
 Demonax perdubius Holzschuh, 1993
 Demonax perspicuus Holzschuh, 1992
 Demonax piliger Holzschuh, 1992
 Demonax planatoides Dauber, 2006
 Demonax planatus Pascoe, 1869
 Demonax planicollis Holzschuh, 1991
 Demonax proximus Holzschuh, 1991
 Demonax pseudopsilomerus Gressitt & Rondon, 1970
 Demonax pudicus (Newman, 1842)
 Demonax puerilis Holzschuh, 1991
 Demonax pumilio Holzschuh, 1991
 Demonax quadricollis Gahan, 1906
 Demonax quadricolor Gahan, 1894
 Demonax ravus Holzschuh, 1992
 Demonax recurvus Aurivillius, 1923
 Demonax reductispinosus Gressitt, 1942
 Demonax reticulatus (Jordan, 1894)
 Demonax rollei Pic, 1943
 Demonax rosae Holzschuh, 1983
 Demonax rouyeri Pic, 1925
 Demonax rufus Guo & Chen, 2005
 Demonax sabinae Holzschuh, 1983
 Demonax saltarius Pascoe, 1869
 Demonax salvazai Pic, 1923
 Demonax sausai Holzschuh, 1995
 Demonax sawaii Ikeda, 1990
 Demonax seoulensis Mitono & Cho, 1942
 Demonax shuti Dauber, 2006
 Demonax siccus Holzschuh, 1991
 Demonax simulatus Dauber, 2003
 Demonax sospitalis Pascoe, 1869
 Demonax spinicornis (Newman, 1850)
 Demonax stabilis Holzschuh, 2003
 Demonax stigma Holzschuh, 1991
 Demonax strangaliomimus Heller, 1926
 Demonax subai Holzschuh, 1989
 Demonax submaculatus (Hayashi, 1974)
 Demonax sulinensis Niisato, 1984
 Demonax tectus Holzschuh, 1991
 Demonax tener Holzschuh, 2003
 Demonax tenuiculus Holzschuh, 1991
 Demonax tenuispinosus Pascoe, 1869
 Demonax testaceus (Hope, 1831)
 Demonax tibiellus Holzschuh, 1991
 Demonax tipularius Pascoe, 1869
 Demonax transversalis Aurivillius, 1910
 Demonax traudae Holzschuh, 1983
 Demonax triguttatus Aurivillius, 1928
 Demonax trivittatus Aurivillius, 1922
 Demonax trudae Holzschuh, 1983
 Demonax unicolor Aurivillius, 1923
 Demonax uniformis Pic, 1925
 Demonax vilis Holzschuh, 1991
 Demonax virescens Aurivillius, 1928
 Demonax walkeri (Pascoe, 1859)
 Demonax x-signatus Pic, 1943
 Demonax viduatus Holzschuh, 2009
 Demonax interruptus Pascoe, 1869
 Demonax curvofasciatus (Gressitt, 1939)
 Demonax palliatus Pascoe, 1869
 Demonax annamensis Pic, 1943
 Demonax aureicollis (Blanchard, 1853)
 Demonax diversefasciatus Pic, 1920
 Demonax fochi Pic, 1918
 Demonax marnei Pic, 1918
 Demonax proculscuti Li, Tian & Chen, 2013
 Demonax venosulus Holzschuh, 2006
 Demonax arcuatus Matsushita, 1939
 Demonax erythrops (Chevrolat, 1863)

References

Clytini
Beetles described in 1860